"Instrumental" and "value-rational action" are terms scholars use to identify two kinds of behavior that humans can engage in.  Scholars call using means that "work" as tools, instrumental action, and pursuing ends that are "right" as legitimate ends, value-rational action.

These terms were coined by sociologist Max Weber, who observed people attaching subjective meanings to their actions.  Acts people treated as conditional means he labeled "instrumentally rational." Acts people treated as unconditional ends he labeled "value-rational."  He found everyone acting for both kinds of reasons, but justifying individual acts by one reason or the other.

Here are Weber's original definitions, followed by a comment showing his doubt that ends considered unconditionally right can be achieved by means considered to be conditionally efficient.  An action may be:

Max Weber
Although Weber coined these terms for rational action, he did not use them consistently.  Sometimes he called instrumental means "calculation of material interests" or "everyday purposive conduct."  He called value-rational ends "ideal motives enjoined by religion or magic.  His inconsistency—followed by later scholars—makes it hard to decide which kind of action is under consideration. But his original distinction survives as the core of modern explanations of rational social action: instrumental means are thought to be value-free conditionally-efficient tools, and value-rational ends are thought to be fact-free  unconditionally-legitimate rules.
     
As Weber studied human action in religious, governmental, and economic settings, he found peoples' reasoning evolving and often contaminating itself by converting conditional means into unconditional ends.  Pre-modern peoples impute to animate and inanimate objects alike the free-will and purpose they find in human action—a belief called animism.  They use instrumentally efficient means to control non-human wills.  But applying means-end reasoning to control spirits and inanimate objects contaminates human knowledge.  A rain-dance mistakenly thought to work instrumentally becomes a prescribed ritual action proclaimed to be permanently legitimate regardless of actual consequences.  Instrumentally-ineffective means became prescribed value-rational ends-in-themselves.  Similar contamination occurs in modern societies when instrumental actions that actually "work" temporarily become accepted as intrinsically efficient, converting context-dependent action-as-means into permanently legitimate action-as-end.

Weber knew (and personally regretted) that European societies had been rejecting supernatural rules of behavior since the Age of Enlightenment.  He called this discrediting of value-rational ends "disenchantment", and feared that placing faith in practical conditional ends destroys human freedom to believe in ultimate moral ends. Jürgen Habermas quoted Weber expressing dismay at this destruction of an intrinsic moral compass for human societies:

As a scientist, Weber did not judge disenchantment.  But he continued to believe that instrumental means are neither legitimate nor workable without value-rational ends.  Even apparently impersonal scientific inquiry, he argued, depends on intrinsic value-rational beliefs as much as does religion.  A recent study argues that his analysis provides legitimate means for restoring value-rational action as a permanent constraint on instrumental action.

Talcott Parsons
Talcott Parsons used Weber's classic terms for society-wide patterns of rational action.  In his 1938 work, The Structure of Social Action, he quoted Weber's definitions and integrated them into the theory he called "social harmonized action systems.  He called his theoretical framework a "means-end schema" in which individuals coordinate their instrumental actions by an "efficiency-norm and their value-rational actions by a "legitimacy-norm".  His prime example of instrumental action was the same as Weber's: widespread use of utilitarian means to satisfy individual ends.  His prime example of value-rational action was institutionalised rituals found in all societies: culturally prescribed but eternally legitimate ends.

Rational humans pursue socially legitimate value-rational ends by using operationally efficient instrumental means.

Parsons thus placed Weber' rational actions in a "patterned normative order" of "cultural value patterns". Rational social action seeks to maintain a culture-bound value-rational order, legitimate in itself. The system maintains itself by means of four instrumental functions: pattern maintenance, goal attainment, adaptation, and integration.  Weber's instrumental and value-rational action survives in Parson's system of culturally correlated means and ends.

Jürgen Habermas
Despite coining new names, Jürgen Habermas followed Parsons in using Weber's classic kinds of rational action to explain human behavior.  In his 1981 work, The Theory of Communicative Action, he sometimes called instrumental action "teleological" action or simply "work".  Value-rational action appeared as "normatively regulated".  In later works he distinguished the two kinds of action by motives.  Instrumental action has "nonpublic and actor-relative reasons," and value-rational action "publicly defensible and actor-independent reasons".

In addition, he proposed a new kind of social action—communicative—necessary to explain how individual instrumental action becomes prescribed in legitimate patterns of social interaction, thus eliminating their separation.  James Gouinlock expressed Habermas's proposal as follows:

Habermas argued that language communities share a background of value-rational symbols that constitutes "a normative context recognized as legitimate".  It establishes an "intersubjectively shared lifeworld of knowledge that plays the role of correlating moral actions that Weber assigned to value rationality and Parsons assigned to institutions—a trans-empirical realm of shared beliefs.  Shared understanding produced by direct communication creates a collective consciousness of instrumental knowledge—technological reality—and of moral rules—value reality—capable of generating prescribed patterns of correlated behavior.

Habermas reasoned that mutual understanding produced by communicative action provides socially legitimate value-rational norms.  But power structures, such as Weber's religions, bureaucracies, and markets, prescribe contaminated patterns of behavior resulting in "cultural impoverishment" similar to Weber's disenchantment.  He shared Weber's fear of the domination of instrumental over value-rational action: "... instrumental rationality (as functionalist reason) has expanded from its appropriate realm of system organization into the lifeworld, and has thereby begun to erode the communicative competences of the members of that lifeworld".  Instrumental motives for conformity to amoral institutional norms replace voluntarily shared norms of communicative action.

Habermas replaced Weber's unconditional value-rational ends and Parsons' unconditional maintenance of patterned normative ends by communicative action to explain observed action correlating instrumental means and value-rational ends.

John Dewey 
John Dewey could agree with Weber's observation that people act as if they judge and act separately on instrumental means and value-rational ends.  But he denied that the practice creates two separate kinds of  rational behavior. When judged independently, means cannot work and ends are not legitimate.

Dewey argued that singular human actions cannot be explained by isolated motives, as Weber sought to do.  For humans in society, the bulk of individual actions are habitual "ways of acting," like driving a car.  Every action is embedded in biological and cultural environments, which humans continuously reshape instrumentally to promote developmental patterns of behavior: efficient driving adapts constantly to road conditions.

Dewey had argued before Habermas that correlated action depends on communication.  But communication is not a separate  form of action preceding and enabling instrumental action.  Rather, according to James Gouinlock, Dewey held that communication inheres in all correlated behavior.

Once correlated patterns of behavior become institutionalised habits, they require little thought, as Weber recognized.  "... life is impossible without ways of action sufficiently general to be properly named habits".  But habits arise only after instrumental actions successfully achieve each valued end.  They are neither non-rational, as Weber classified them, nor immediately-known value-rational actions, as other philosophers classify them, undertaken without regard to existing means.

Where Parsons and Habermas concluded that culturally accredited institutions legitimize value-rational ends, Dewey concluded that they are often contaminated instrumental valuations—flawed inductive generalizations—that should be reconstructed rather than treated as moral affirmations of rational action.

Dewey's challenge to Weber's separation between instrumental and value-rational action remains unanswered.  The distinction persists in both common sense and scholarly explanations of human behavior.

See also

Consequentialism
Instrumental and value rationality
Instrumentalism
Intrinsic value (ethics)
Scientific realism
Veblenian dichotomy
Fact-value distinction

References

Sociological terminology
Jürgen Habermas